Pouteria amygdalina is a species of plant in the family Sapotaceae. It is found in Belize and Guatemala.

References

amygdalina
Vulnerable plants
Taxonomy articles created by Polbot
Taxa named by Charles Baehni
Taxa named by Paul Carpenter Standley